Chengcang Charles Wu is a Chinese-born American scientist with expertise in the fields of genetics, bioinformatics, and genomics, particularly large fragment DNA cloning and BAC (Bacterial Artificial Chromosome) library technologies.

Accomplishments 
Wu is the main contributor of the first soybean physical map.  He is also one of the inventors of plant artificial chromosomes, Fungal Artificial Chromosomes and related technologies.

Biotechnology involvement 
Wu was the founding vice president of Lucigen Corporation. In 2013, Wu Founded Intact Genomics, Inc. in St. Louis Missouri.

Education 
Anhui Agricultural University, China, B.S., Biology. M.S., Genetics

Iwate University, Japan, Ph.D, Bioenvironmental Science

References 

Living people
Anhui Agricultural University alumni
Iwate University alumni
Chinese emigrants to the United States
Chinese geneticists
American geneticists
Year of birth missing (living people)